The Beast is the sixth album by the Polish death metal band Vader. It was released on 8 September 2004 in Japan by Marquee/Avalon, 20 September in Poland via Metal Mind Productions, and a day later in Europe and the United States by Metal Blade Records.

The album's working title was Spiritual Disease. The release was preceded by the single "Beware the Beast", which was released on 25 August 2004. The album was nominated for a Fryderyk Award in the category 'Metal Album of the Year (Album roku metal)'. Two music videos have been made for the songs "Dark Transmission" and "Choices", which were directed by Wojciech Głodek. Video clips were shot at RG Studio while recording the album. In Poland, The Beast landed at position No. 8, and dropped out five weeks later. The album also charted in Japan.

The album was recorded between May and June 2004 at RG Studio in Gdańsk, Poland, and was produced by Piotr Wiwczarek. The album was mastered by Jacek Gawłowski at JG Lab Studio in Warsaw, Poland. Originally, drum sessions took place at Hertz Studio in Białystok in February 2004 with drummer Krzysztof "Doc" Raczkowski, however, Raczkowski fell down a flight of stairs, causing arm and leg injuries. Because of the accident, the studio sessions was postponed. Ultimately, the band decided to hire Vesania drummer Dariusz "Daray" Brzozowski as a session musician. Piotr "Peter" Wiwczarek talked about the accident while working on the album, saying:

Track listing

Personnel
Production and performance credits are adapted from the album liner notes.

Beware the Beast

"Beware the Beast" is the fifth single by the Polish death metal band Vader. It was released only in Poland on 24 August 2004 by Empire Records. The release features two songs "Dark Transmission (333.version)", "Stranger in the Mirror", studio report, and music video for "Dark Transmission".

The studio report consists walk through the main recording process of The Beast album, interview with band members, and studio engineer Piotr Łukaszewski. Marcin "Novy" Nowak despite being shown in video did not record any off bass lines which were handled by Piotr "Peter" Wiwczarek.

Track listing

Charts

Weekly

Monthly

Release history

References

Vader (band) albums
2004 albums
Metal Blade Records albums
Metal Mind Productions albums